City Garage Yard and Fire Drill Tower, also known as City Place, is a historic municipal services complex located at Durham, Durham County, North Carolina. The City Garage is an expansive, largely one-story, polygonal structure with multiple equipment-size access bays.  It features arcaded bays and stepped and rounded parapets.  The Garage was built in 1927, with 1935, 1940s, c. 1955, and c. 1965 additions. 

The Fire Drill Tower (1928) is a narrow six-story building.  It features pilasters, blind arches, and round-arched belfry openings.  Also on the property are the contributing Signs and Markings Shop (c. 1948, c. 1965) and the Employees' Restroom (c. 1948).

It was listed on the National Register of Historic Places in 2000.

Gallery

References

Government buildings on the National Register of Historic Places in North Carolina
Romanesque Revival architecture in North Carolina
Colonial Revival architecture in North Carolina
Government buildings completed in 1927
Buildings and structures in Durham, North Carolina
National Register of Historic Places in Durham County, North Carolina
Firefighting in North Carolina
Towers in North Carolina